Silverman v. United States, 365 U.S. 505 (1961), is a United States Supreme Court case in which the Court unanimously held that a federal officer may not, without warrant, physically place themselves into the space of a person's office or home to secretly observe or listen and relate at the man's subsequent criminal trial what was seen or heard.

External links
 

United States Supreme Court cases
1961 in United States case law
United States Supreme Court cases of the Warren Court